The Dominican Sisters of the Heart of Jesus are located in Lockport, Louisiana. This group is not in any way associated with, approved, or recognized by the Diocese of Houma-Thibodaux, nor is it listed in the diocesan Directory, as per Fr. P. J. Madden, Diocesan Administrator (9 September 2022).  

The sisters do not have papal or Constitutional enclosure.  They live a penitential life of prayer, study, community and work.  They are consecrated to God by  profession (of private, simple vows) of the evangelical counsels  of chastity, poverty and obedience .  This community is not a member of the Second Order of Friars Preachers and has not gained full recognition by the Dominican Order.  

The Dominican Nuns came into existence 800 years ago (1206) when Saint Dominic began his Order of Preachers by first establishing a cloistered monastery of women in Prouille, France. In 1880, Dominican monastic life took root in the United States.  Approximately 50 years later, only days after her sixteenth birthday, the then Anna Rita McKanna (later receiving the name in religion, Sister Mary Henry of Jesus, O.P.) entered the Dominican Monastery of the Blessed Sacrament in Detroit, Michigan (since relocated to Farmington Hills, Michigan).  Shortly after her solemn profession of vows there, this exemplary young religious was chosen to be one of the foundresses of the Dominican Monastery of the Infant Jesus in Lufkin, Texas (1945).  Thirty-six years later, the Reverend Mother Mary Henry of Jesus, O.P., set out to found the Dominican Monastery of the Heart of Jesus in Lockport, Louisiana.

Hospitality 

There is also a guesthouse on the monastery grounds with accommodations for individuals or groups.  There are openings available year round.  Discernment-based days consist of sharing in the liturgical prayer life of the Dominican Nuns within a balanced schedule that includes a daily series of personal/group interviews and question sessions in the grille parlor.  It is during this time that a particular vocation to the Community may be explored.  Private or silent retreats are an option generally exclusive to priests and religious.  However, arrangements may be considered for others such as seminarians, tertiaries, or single women.  Advance reservations are required.

See also 
 Dominican Order
 Dominican Nuns

References

External links 

Dominican nuns
Dominican monasteries in the United States